Maria Jepsen (born 19 January 1945, in Bad Segeberg) is the former bishop of Hamburg in the North Elbian Evangelical Lutheran Church. On 4 April 1992 the synod of the Hamburg Ambit elected her bishop, the first Lutheran woman to be a bishop worldwide, and since then she has been re-elected for a second ten-year period.

On 16 July 2010 she resigned due to allegations that she did not act on information about an abuse case in her ambit of the church in 1999.

References

External links
 Official Biography of Maria Jepsen (German)

1945 births
Living people
People from Segeberg
Bishops of Hamburg
Women Lutheran bishops
20th-century German Lutheran bishops
21st-century German Lutheran bishops